Prijevor is a village located in the city of Čačak, Serbia. According to the 2011 census, the village has a population of 1,603 people.

References

Populated places in Moravica District